The Teatro Guaíra Cultural Centre is a state-run cultural institution located in Curitiba, Paraná.

Its building, located at Santos Andrade square, shelters about 3,000 seats in three different auditoria, being one of the largest concert halls in Latin America.

Some of the artists' groups maintained by Teatro Guaíra  Culture Centre are: the Symphony Orchestra of Paraná, the "Balé Teatro Guaíra" (dance company) and the "Teatro de Comédia do Paraná" (theater group).

References

Theatres in Curitiba